The 1924 Georgia Normal Blue Tide football team represented Georgia Normal School—now known as Georgia Southern University– during the 1924 college football season. The team was coached by E. G. Cromartie, in his first season.

Schedule

References

Georgia Normal
Georgia Southern Eagles football seasons
Georgia Normal Blue Tide football